Monroe David Donsker (October 17, 1924 – June 8, 1991) was an American mathematician and a professor of mathematics at New York University (NYU). His research interest was probability theory.

Education and career 
Donsker was born in Burlington, Iowa.  He received a Ph.D. in mathematics at the University of Minnesota in 1948 under the supervision of Robert Horton Cameron.  He became a professor at NYU's Courant Institute of Mathematical Sciences in 1962, about a year before his frequent co-author S.R.S. Varadhan started working there. Before joining NYU, Donsker taught at Cornell University and the University of Minnesota. His doctoral students include Glen E. Baxter.

Donsker also served as chair of the Fulbright Foreign Scholarship Board, a U.S. government panel responsible for student exchange programs, after being appointed by presidents Ford and Carter.

In probability theory, Donsker is known for his proof of the Donsker invariance principle which shows the convergence in distribution of a rescaled random walk to the Wiener process.

Personal life 
Donsker was married to Mary Davis (1923 – 2013), who was a watercolor artist with a degree in economics from University of Minnesota.

See also 
 Donsker's theorem

References

External links 
 

1924 births
1991 deaths
University of Minnesota College of Liberal Arts alumni
20th-century American mathematicians
Probability theorists
People from Burlington, Iowa
Educators from Minnesota
Mathematical statisticians
Courant Institute of Mathematical Sciences faculty
Cornell University faculty
University of Minnesota faculty
New York University faculty